Monette, also known as Manette (fl. 1760s), was a Native American enslaved woman of John Askin. She gave birth to three children who were educated and married into prominent families of the Great Lakes regions of present-day Michigan and Ontario, Canada. Her son was John Askin Jr. Daughter Catherine married Captain William Robertson, who operated one of Askin's boats, and was married a second time to Robert Hamilton, founder of Queenston, Ontario. Daughter Madeline was married to Dr. Robert Richardson, the surgeon of the Queen's Rangers stationed at Fort George.

Enslaved to John Askin
Monette was purchased from René Bourassa by John Askin for 50 pounds. The sale took place before 1762 at the Straits of Mackinac, a trading center. One of Monette and Askin's son-in-law states in a letter that his Native American mother-in-law was a Pawaneese slave who was captured in war. She was described as a Panis, enslaved people for Seneca people and other warring tribes affiliated with the French.  Monette was one of several indigenous and Black enslaved people owned by Askin. He also had a contract with at least one indentured servant.

Monette lived with Askin at L'Arbre Croche, a key Odawa village in Michigan. Askin's purchase of Monette helped him develop relationships with Native Americans who knew her. It was common for traders to have children with Native American women to develop connections with their tribes. According to Milo M. Quaife, "known facts concerning Askin’s character during his long career are such as to give assurance that his treatment of her [Monette] was both honorable and kind, judged by the standards of his time and environment."

Askin owned eight enslaved people. Generally, fur traders used enslaved people to handle furs, grow food, cook, and clean. They also took Native American enslaved women as partners and companions.

Monette was manumitted on September 9, 1766, at Detroit. Askin moved to Detroit by 1781.

Children
As an enslaved woman, she was subject to serial rape, which resulted in the births of two daughters and a son. John Askin, Jr. was born at L'Arbre Croche in early 1762, Charlotte was born in late 1762, and Madeline was born in 1764. Monette's children were treated well by Askin, grew up free, and were educated. They all entered into honorable marriages. Monette's children had nine half-siblings through Askin's marriage in 1772 to Marie Archange Barthe. She was the daughter of Charles Barthe, a successful merchant.

John Askin Jr.
Around 1772, John Askin Jr. was sent to be educated by his trading associates. His care and education were overseen by Robert Ellices of Phyn and Ellice, who enrolled him in a school in Schenectady, New York. He was an apprentice in the trading business in New York and Montreal. John Jr. was schooled in Montreal by 1778, when Askin asked for his son to be returned to begin to work for him. His education, apprenticeships, Native American heritage, and ability to speak Native American languages made him a valuable trader. In 1801, John Jr. became a collector of customs in Amherstburg, Upper Canada, and six years later he worked at St. Joseph Island, for the Indian Department.

Catherine Askin Robertson Hamilton
Catherine, nicknamed Kitty, was educated at a convent of Congrégation de Notre Dame in Montreal. She married Captain William Robertson, who operated on of Askin's boats, and was married a second time to Robert Hamilton, founder of Queenston. The Hamiltons lived in a mansion in Queenston and sent their children to school in Scotland. Catherine died of consumption in December 1796.

Madeline Askin Richardson
Madeline, born in L'Arbre Croche, was educated at the Congrégation de Notre Dame in Montreal. She visited her sister Catherine in the winter of 1793, where she met and married Dr. Robert Richardson, who was a surgeon of the Queen's Rangers at Fort George. Her son John Richardson was born October 4, 1796, in Queenston at his aunt Catherine's residence or at Fort George. The family was stationed two years later at Fort Erie and were then at York, Ontario and Fort Joseph, which was located in the northern frontier of Upper Canada. Their son John went to live with John Askin and his wife Marie in Detroit, where he was cared for and educated. John returned to his parents when they were moved to Amherstburg when Dr. Richardson was posted at Fort Malden, where their son Robert was born. John received a good education at Amherstburg, having studied Latin and Euclid, but was subject to bullying. Madeline traveled by boat or horse-drawn sleighs or vehicles to visit the Askins, who lived about 20 miles away at Strabane, where John Askin lived on the Canadian side of the Detroit River after 1783. The Strabane mansion was named after John Askin's birthplace in Ireland. Madeline died of consumption in January 1811. Soon afterward her ninth child also died of the disease.

Notes

References

Bibliography
 

Year of birth unknown
Year of death unknown
18th-century American slaves
People from Michigan
18th-century Native American women